James Gordon Burton (born May 3, 1937) is a former Lieutenant colonel in the United States Air Force who became famous for his actions as a whistleblower on the development of the Bradley Fighting Vehicle and his subsequent book The Pentagon Wars: Reformers Challenge the Old Guard, later adopted into the 1998 HBO military comedy film The Pentagon Wars.

Biography 

Born at the end of the Great Depression in rural McLean County, Illinois Burton was a member of the inaugural class of the United States Air Force Academy, graduating in 1959. He was described as one of the outstanding leaders of the class, and was twice selected for Group Commander duty in his final year. He was an above-average student academically and a power hitting outfielder on the baseball field, and was one of four outstanding members of the class selected to meet President Dwight D. Eisenhower at the White House.

He was removed from flying status after a fainting episode revealed internal bleeding. Unable to diagnose the cause (partly due to a malformed stomach he was born with), doctors treated him for a bleeding stomach ulcer. This stopped the bleeding, but, due to the time that diagnosis and treatment took, saw him permanently grounded and led to a second career in weapons procurement at The Pentagon. He moved to the Development Plans Office at the Pentagon and moved rapidly up the ranks.

In his Pentagon roles, Burton became part of a small cadre of military officers and civilians in government service who started to internally challenge the way in which weapons systems were procured, and in the early 1980’s began to tell ‘anyone who would listen about weapons systems that would cost billions of dollars more than advertised, or perform far less effectively than was claimed, or both.’

Bradley Fighting Vehicle 

Working for the Director, Operational Test and Evaluation at the Office of the Secretary of Defense, Burton advocated for the use of live-fire tests on fully loaded military vehicles to check for survivability, something that the Army and Air Force agreed to, establishing the joint live fire testing program in 1984.

An investigation by the House Armed Services Committee found that Burton’s claims were due not to malfeasance but rather the result of  “a long-standing fundamental disagreement over testing methodology and, more importantly, the inability of OSD and the Army to reach an agreement on how the test is conducted. ...The Army has complied with many of Colonel Burton's issues of concern over the past several years."

Retirement 

Burton retired instead of accepting a transfer in 1986, in a move that some claim was politically motivated as revenge for his criticism of the Bradley program. Senator David Pryor of Arkansas and Representative Mel Levine of California launched their own study of Burton's case, which found a report released by the Office of Inspector General to be ″incomplete and misleading. Significant episodes and evidence are omitted; important aspects are seriously understated...″

In 1993, Burton released his book The Pentagon Wars: Reformers Challenge the Old Guard. The book was adapted into satirical comedy film The Pentagon Wars in 1998.

In Popular Culture 

Burton was played by Cary Elwes in the 1998 HBO comedy adoption of his book.

References 

American whistleblowers
United States Air Force colonels
United States Air Force officers
United States Air Force Academy alumni
People from Illinois
1937 births
Living people